Paulo Silas do Prado Pereira (born 27 August 1965), also known as Paulo Silas, Silas Pereira or simply Silas, is a Brazilian football pundit, coach, and former professional player.

A former central midfielder, he is now a television pundit for ESPN Brasil.

Club career
During his playing career from 1984 to 2003 he played in Brazil, Portugal, Uruguay, Argentina, Japan and Italy at São Paulo, Internacional, Vasco da Gama, Atlético Paranaense, Rio Branco de Americana, Ituano, América Mineiro, Portuguesa, Internacional de Limeira, Sporting Lisbon, San Lorenzo de Almagro, Central Español, Kyoto Purple Sanga, A.C. Cesena and U.C. Sampdoria.

International career
With the Brazilian Youth Team, Silas won the Adidas Golden Ball at 1985 FIFA World Youth Championship, and with the senior team he played 38 matches (34 official), from March 1986 to December 1992, and participated in the 1986 and 1990 FIFA World Cups.

Coaching career
On 7 December 2009, chairman Duda Kroeff introduced the 44-year-old as the new manager of Grêmio. According to club director Luis Onofre Meira, "Silas is the manager we need for our team – young, but still an expert with many victories in his career. In fact, he was the best manager in 2009.

On 19 March 2012, 46-year-old Paulo Silas replaced Bruno Metsu as Al Gharafa new coach.

Silas led Al Gharafa to win the 2012 Emir of Qatar Cup on 12 May after they defeated Al Sadd on penalties. On 27 November 2012, he was sacked by Al-Gharafa after a 5–1 loss to Al-Rayyan.

Personal life
Silas was born in Campinas, São Paulo, Brazil.

Career statistics

Club

International

Honours

Player
Sampdoria
Supercoppa Italiana: 1991

Managerial
Al-Arabi
Sheikh Jassem Cup: 2011

Al-Gharafa
Emir of Qatar Cup: 2012

Ceará
Copa do Nordeste: 2015

References

External links
 
 
 
 Futpédia
 
 
 
 Pelé.net - Entrevista

Sportspeople from Campinas
Association football midfielders
Brazilian footballers
Brazilian expatriate footballers
Brazil international footballers
Brazil under-20 international footballers
Copa América-winning players
Campeonato Brasileiro Série A players
Uruguayan Primera División players
Primeira Liga players
J1 League players
Serie A players
Argentine Primera División players
Expatriate footballers in Argentina
Expatriate footballers in Portugal
Expatriate footballers in Italy
Expatriate footballers in Japan
Expatriate footballers in Uruguay
1986 FIFA World Cup players
1990 FIFA World Cup players
1987 Copa América players
1989 Copa América players
1965 births
Living people
Brazilian football managers
Brazilian expatriate football managers
Expatriate football managers in Qatar
Campeonato Brasileiro Série A managers
Campeonato Brasileiro Série B managers
Campeonato Brasileiro Série D managers
São Paulo FC players
Sporting CP footballers
Central Español players
A.C. Cesena players
U.C. Sampdoria players
Sport Club Internacional players
CR Vasco da Gama players
San Lorenzo de Almagro footballers
Kyoto Sanga FC players
Club Athletico Paranaense players
Rio Branco Esporte Clube players
Ituano FC players
América Futebol Clube (MG) players
Associação Portuguesa de Desportos players
Associação Atlética Internacional (Limeira) players
Fortaleza Esporte Clube managers
Avaí FC managers
Grêmio Foot-Ball Porto Alegrense managers
CR Flamengo managers
Al-Arabi SC (Qatar) managers
Al-Gharafa SC managers
Clube Náutico Capibaribe managers
América Futebol Clube (MG) managers
Associação Portuguesa de Desportos managers
Ceará Sporting Club managers
Grêmio Novorizontino managers
Red Bull Brasil managers
Esporte Clube São Bento managers